Adam Berg (1540–1610) was a German printer and publisher who is best remembered for his work as a music publisher and for his publication of Catholic religious texts. His publishing company was based in Munich, and he actively published music there from 1567–1597. His most notable music publication was Patrocinium musicum which was published in ten volumes from 1573–1580, five of which were devoted to music by composer Orlande de Lassus.

References

Sources
Bibliographie des chants populaires français by Paul de Beaurepaire-Froment
Ecrits de musiciens by Jacques-Gabriel Prod’homme

1540 births
1610 deaths
German music publishers (people)
Sheet music publishers (people)
16th-century German businesspeople
17th-century German businesspeople